Sinamma is a genus of spiders in the family Tetrablemmidae. It was first described in 2014 by Lin & Li. , it contains only one Chinese species, Sinamma oxycera.

References

Tetrablemmidae
Monotypic Araneomorphae genera
Spiders of China